The XIV Bolivarian Games (Spanish: Juegos Bolivarianos) were a multi-sport event held between September 7–16, 2001, in Ambato, Ecuador. Some events took place in Guayaquil and in Quito.  The Games were organized by the Bolivarian Sports Organization (ODEBO).

The opening ceremony took place on September 7, 2001, at the Estadio Bellavista in Ambato, Ecuador.  The Games were officially opened by Ecuadorean Minister for Education, Culture and Sports (Spanish: ministro de Educación, Cultura y Deportes) Roberto Hanze as a delegate for president Gustavo Noboa.  Torch lighter was racewalker, olympic gold medalist Jefferson Pérez.

Gold medal winners from Ecuador were published by the Comité Olímpico Ecuatoriano.

Venues 
Ambato hosted the following competitions: athletics, basketball, bodybuilding, boxing, chess, climbing (alpinism), football, artistic gymnastics, rhythmic gymnastics, judo, karate, squash, table tennis, taekwondo, tennis, volleyball, weightlifting, wrestling

Guayaquil hosted the following competitions: archery, baseball, beach volleyball, billiards, bowling, canoeing, racquetball, rowing,  shooting, softball, surfing, swimming, triathlon, yachting

Quito hosted the following competitions: cycling, equestrian, fencing

Participation 
About 2000 athletes from 6 countries were reported to participate:

Sports 
The following 29 sports (+ 4 exhibition) were explicitly mentioned:<ref
name=coe/>

Aquatic sports 
 Swimming
 Archery†
 Athletics
 Baseball
 Basketball
 Billiards
 Bodybuilding†
 Bowling
 Boxing
 Canoeing
 Chess†
 Climbing†
Cycling 
 Road cycling
 Track cycling
 Equestrian
 Fencing
 Football‡
Gymnastics 
 Artistic gymnastics
 Rhythmic gymnastics
 Judo
 Karate
 Racquetball
 Rowing
 Sailing
 Shooting
 Softball
 Squash
 Surfing†
 Table tennis
 Taekwondo
 Tennis
 Triathlon
Volleyball
 Beach volleyball
 Volleyball
 Weightlifting
 Wrestling

†: Exhibition event.
‡: The competition was reserved to youth representatives (U-17).

Medal count 
The medal count for these Games is tabulated below.  A slightly different number of medals was published elsewhere.  This table is sorted by the number of gold medals earned by each country.  The number of silver medals is taken into consideration next, and then the number of bronze medals.

References 

Bolivarian Games
B
Bolivarian Games
B
B
Multi-sport events in Ecuador
Ambato, Ecuador
September 2001 sports events in South America